Defending champions Esther Vergeer and Sharon Walraven defeated Jiske Griffioen and Aniek van Koot in the final, 7–5, 6–7(8–10), 6–4 to win the women's doubles wheelchair tennis title at the 2011 US Open. With the win, they completed the Grand Slam.

Seeds
  Esther Vergeer /  Sharon Walraven (champions)
  Jiske Griffioen /  Aniek van Koot (final)

Doubles

Finals

External links
Main Draw

Wheelchair Women's Doubles
U.S. Open, 2011 Women's Doubles